Etcherla is a village in Srikakulam district of the Indian state of Andhra Pradesh. It is the Mandal headquarters of Etcherla mandal. Most of the people in this region speak Telugu.

References  

Villages in Srikakulam district
Mandal headquarters in Srikakulam district